Aethes lateritia is a species of moth of the family Tortricidae. It was described by Razowski in 1970. It is found in Iran and Pakistan.

References

lateritia
Moths described in 1970
Moths of Asia
Taxa named by Józef Razowski